Every Second Counts is a 2003 autobiography by cyclist Lance Armstrong written in collaboration with sports writer and columnist Sally Jenkins. It is a follow-up to Armstrong's It's Not About the Bike: My Journey Back to Life which was also written with Sally Jenkins. The narrative begins from after Armstrong's first Tour de France win in 1999 and continues up until his fifth win in 2003.

Following investigations into doping allegations against him, Armstrong was stripped of all his seven Tour titles on October 22, 2012. In Jan 2013, he confessed that some of the allegations were true. In light of Armstrong's confession, the passages about doping in the book are doubtful. In Every Second Counts, Armstrong shares more details of his life story, including four more Tour de France wins, an Olympic medal, and the births of his twin daughters, as well as his thoughts on training, competing, winning, doping and failure. He also recounts the work done for the Livestrong Foundation he set up following his recovery from cancer.

References

See also

 It's Not About the Bike: My Journey Back to Life

Sports autobiographies
2003 non-fiction books
Cycling books
Lance Armstrong